Banvit Kara Ali Acar Sport Hall is an indoor arena located in the Bandırma town of Balıkesir Province, Turkey. The arena mostly hosts basketball games and is the home arena of the Bandırma Basketbol İhtisas and Bandırma Kırmızı basketball teams. It has a seating capacity for 3,000 spectators.

History
Kara Ali Acar Sport Hall opened in the year 2001.

References

External links
Banvit Kara Ali Acar Sport Hall Photo Gallery .

Basketball venues in Turkey
Sport in Balıkesir
Indoor arenas in Turkey
Turkish Basketball League venues
Buildings and structures in Balıkesir Province
Sports venues completed in 2001
2001 establishments in Turkey